Lucie Sekanová (born 5 August 1989) is a Czech long-distance runner competing primarily in the 3000 metres steeplechase. She represented her country at the 2015 World Championships in Beijing without qualifying for the final.

In 2017, she competed in the women's 3000 metres steeplechase event at the 2017 World Championships in Athletics held in London, United Kingdom. She did not advance to compete in the final.

Competition record

Personal bests
Outdoor
1500 metres – 4:17.15 (Ostrava 2015)
3000 metres – 9:11.90 (Herakleion 2015)
5000 metres – 15:43.94 (Huelva 2015)
10,000 metres – 33:22.90 (Jičín 2014)
10 kilometres – 33:43 (Berlin 2013)
Half marathon – 1:17:39 (Prague 2014)
3000 metres steeplechase – 9:41.84 (Mersin 2015)
Indoor
1500 metres – 4:24.87 (Vienna 2009)
3000 metres – 9:22.65 (Prague 2017)

References

External links
 

1989 births
Living people
Czech female long-distance runners
Czech female steeplechase runners
World Athletics Championships athletes for the Czech Republic
People from Prachatice
Athletes (track and field) at the 2016 Summer Olympics
Olympic athletes of the Czech Republic
Competitors at the 2017 Summer Universiade
Sportspeople from the South Bohemian Region